"Rock and Roll Heaven" is a song written by Alan O'Day and Johnny Stevenson, popularized by The Righteous Brothers. It is a paean to several deceased singers such as Jimi Hendrix, Janis Joplin, and Otis Redding, and has been rewritten a number of times to include other singers. The song was first recorded by the band Climax in 1973, but it failed to chart.  It was then covered by The Righteous Brothers in 1974 and reached number three on the U.S. Billboard Hot 100.

The Righteous Brothers version

The Righteous Brothers recorded "Rock and Roll Heaven" a few weeks after they decided to reform the duo in 1974. They signed with Haven Records run by Dennis Lambert and Brian Potter and were given the song to record. Lambert and Potter rewrote a verse, updating the song to include Jim Croce and Bobby Darin who had died within three months of each other in late 1973. According to Bill Medley, they were dubious about the song because they didn't think the song had the "old Righteous Brothers feel". Nevertheless, it became a hit for them and quickly reached number three on the Billboard Hot 100. In Canada it spent three weeks at number four.

Musicians and songs mentioned in Righteous Brothers version
 "Jimi gave us rainbows" refers to Rainbow Bridge by Jimi Hendrix.
 "Janis took a piece of our hearts" refers to the recording of "Piece of My Heart" by Big Brother and the Holding Company featuring Janis Joplin.
 "Otis brought us all to the dock of the bay" refers to "(Sittin' On) The Dock of the Bay" by Otis Redding.
 "Sing a song to light my fire. Remember Jim that way" refers to "Light My Fire" by The Doors which featured Jim Morrison.
 "Remember bad bad Leroy Brown, Hey Jimmy touched us with that song" refers to "Bad, Bad Leroy Brown" by Jim Croce.
 "Bobby gave us Mack the Knife" refers to Bobby Darin's recording of "Mack the Knife".

The lyrics involving Jim Croce and Bobby Darin replaced Climax's lyrics for Buddy Holly ("Peggy Sue") and Ritchie Valens ("Donna"), both of whom died in a plane crash that had already been commemorated by another hit song, Don McLean's "American Pie."

Also, in 1981, when the Righteous Brothers appeared for a one-song reunion on American Bandstand, they performed "Rock and Roll Heaven", and made it longer including new lyrics as tributes to Elvis Presley, John Lennon, and Keith Moon.

It was rewritten with new lyrics in 1991 to mourn the passing of Elvis Presley ("Love Me Tender"), John Lennon ("Give Peace a Chance"), Roy Orbison ("Oh, Pretty Woman"),  Jackie Wilson ("Higher and Higher"), Ricky Nelson ("Lonesome Town"),  Dennis Wilson ("Good Vibrations"),  Marvin Gaye ("What's Going On"), Sam Cooke ("Wonderful World"), Cass Elliot ("Monday, Monday") who died a few months after the original version of the song was released, and Stevie Ray Vaughan. The rewritten song is included in compilation albums such as Reunion.

In popular culture
A line from the lyrics of the song is used as the title for Stephen King's short story "You Know They Got a Hell of a Band", set in a town called Rock and Roll Heaven.

Chart performance

Weekly charts

Year-end charts

References

External links
Song Facts

1973 singles
1974 singles
Climax (band) songs
The Righteous Brothers songs
Songs written by Alan O'Day
Capitol Records singles
List songs
1973 songs
Songs about rock music
Songs about musicians
Cultural depictions of rock musicians